Dasumia is a genus of  woodlouse hunting spiders that was first described by Tamerlan Thorell in 1875.

Species
 it contains fourteen species:
Dasumia amoena (Kulczyński, 1897) – Eastern Europe, Russia (Caucasus)
Dasumia canestrinii (L. Koch, 1876) – Southern Europe
Dasumia carpatica (Kulczyński, 1882) – Eastern Europe
Dasumia cephalleniae Brignoli, 1976 – Greece
Dasumia chyzeri (Kulczyński, 1906) – Eastern Europe
Dasumia crassipalpis (Simon, 1882) – Syria, Israel
Dasumia diomedea Caporiacco, 1947 – Italy
Dasumia gasparoi Kunt, Özkütük & Elverici, 2011 – Turkey
Dasumia kusceri (Kratochvíl, 1935) – Macedonia, Bulgaria, Kosovo?
Dasumia laevigata (Thorell, 1873) (type) – Europe
Dasumia mariandyna Brignoli, 1979 – Turkey
Dasumia nativitatis Brignoli, 1974 – Greece
Dasumia sancticedri Brignoli, 1978 – Lebanon
Dasumia taeniifera Thorell, 1875 – France, Switzerland, Italy

References

External links

Araneomorphae genera
Dysderidae
Taxa named by Tamerlan Thorell